Punia-Basenge Airport  is an airstrip serving the town of Punia in Maniema Province, Democratic Republic of the Congo. The runway forms a section of the N31 road south of Punia.

See also

 Transport in the Democratic Republic of the Congo
 List of airports in the Democratic Republic of the Congo

References

External links
OpenStreetMap - Punia
 OurAirports - Punia-Basenge
 FallingRain - Punia-Basenge

Airports in Maniema